Stary Kyzyl-Yar (İśke Qıźılyar) is a rural locality (a village) in Nizhnebaltachevsky Selsoviet, Tatyshlinsky District, Bashkortostan, Russia. The population was 201 as of 2010. There are 2 streets.

Geography 
Stary Kyzyl-Yar is located 26 km southeast of Verkhniye Tatyshly (the district's administrative centre) by road. Ivanovka is the nearest rural locality.

References 

Rural localities in Tatyshlinsky District